National Velvet is a sculpture by John McEnroe, installed at the base of Denver's 16th Street Pedestrian Bridge, in the U.S. state of Colorado.

References

Outdoor sculptures in Denver